Mandi Gobindgarh railway station is located in Fatehgarh Sahib district in the Indian state of Punjab and serves the steel town of Mandi Gobindgarh .

The railway station

History
The Scinde, Punjab & Delhi Railway completed  the -long Amritsar–Ambala–Saharanpur–Ghaziabad line in 1870 connecting Multan (now in Pakistan) with Delhi.

Electrification
The Shahbad Markanda-Mandi Gobindgarh sector was electrified in 1995–96.

References

External links
  Trains at Mandi Gobindgarh

Railway stations in Fatehgarh Sahib district
Ambala railway division